Diplolaena dampieri, commonly known as Dampier's rose, is a species of flowering plant in the family Rutaceae. It is endemic to the west coast of Western Australia. It has slightly leathery, oblong-elliptic shaped leaves, hairy bracts and pale red to orange flowers from July to September.

Description
Flowering occurs from July to September.

Taxonomy
Diplolaena dampieri was first formally described in 1817 by René Louiche Desfontaines and the description was published in Memoires du Museum d'Histoire Naturelle.

Distribution and habitat
Dampier's rose grows in the south west from Cape Leeuwin, north to Fremantle in low heath, loamy soils, limestone and sand dunes.

References

Sapindales of Australia
Rosids of Western Australia
Taxa named by René Louiche Desfontaines
Zanthoxyloideae